Chuvanna Chirakukal is a 1978 Indian Malayalam-language film,  directed by N. Sankaran Nair and produced by . The film stars Jayan, Jayabharathi, M. G. Soman and Sharmila Tagore . The film has musical score by Salil Chowdhary.

Cast
 Jayan as Sunny Augustine IAS
 Jayabharathi as Stella Mathews
 M. G. Soman as Johnny Issac
 Sharmila Tagore as Jessinta Issac
 M.G Soman as James Augustine
 Raghavan as Thomaskutty
 Balan K Nair as Mathewson
 Ravikumar as Rajkumar IPS
 Srividhya as Sofy Thomas
 Jose Prakash as Issac Johnson
 Master Raghu as Aldrin Thomas
 Kaviyoor Ponnamma as Annamma Augustine
 Prathap Chandhran as Augustine Fernandez IAS

Soundtrack
The music was composed by A.T Ummer and the lyrics were written by ONV Kurup.

References

External links
 

1979 films
1970s Malayalam-language films
Films scored by Salil Chowdhury
Films directed by N. Sankaran Nair